is a village  located in Nagano Prefecture, Japan. , the village had an estimated population of 2,585 in 1074 households, and a population density of 44 persons per km². Ogawa is listed as one of The Most Beautiful Villages in Japan.

Geography
Ogawa is located in the mountains of northwestern Nagano Prefecture.

Surrounding municipalities
Nagano Prefecture
 Nagano
 Ōmachi
 Hakuba

Climate
The village has a  humid continental climate characterized by short, hot and humid summers, and cold winters with heavy snowfall (Köppen climate classification Cfa).  The average annual temperature in Ogawa is 10.3 °C. The average annual rainfall is 1273 mm with September as the wettest month. The temperatures are highest on average in August, at around 23.8 °C, and lowest in January, at around -2.3 °C.

Demographics
Per Japanese census data, the population of Ogawa has declined by more than three-quarters from its peak around 1950.

History
The area of present-day Ogawa was part of ancient Shinano Province. The villages of Kita-Ogawa and Minami-Ogawa were created with the establishment of the modern municipalities system on April 1, 1889. The two villages merged to form the village of Ogawa on April 1, 1955.

Economy
The economy of Ogawa is agricultural, primarily rice cultivation and horticulture.

Education
Ogawa has one public elementary school and one public middle school operated by the village government. The village does not have a high school.

Transportation

Railway
Ogawa does not have any passenger railway service.

Highway

Local attractions
 Furusato Land Ogawa, local history museum

References

External links

Official Website 

 
Villages in Nagano Prefecture